Waterworks is the provision of water supply by public utilities, commercial organisations, community endeavours, or individuals.

Waterworks may also refer to:

Culture and entertainment
 Waterworks (card game)
 Waterworks (Hollis), a sculpture by Douglas Hollis in Cal Anderson Park, Seattle, Washington, U.S.
 Waterworks!, a video game
 The Waterworks, a 1994 novel by E. L. Doctorow
 "Waterworks" (Better Call Saul), an episode of Better Call Saul

Places
 Water Works, Pennsylvania, commonly known as Water Works, Lebanon County, Pennsylvania, United States
 Water Works, Belfast, Northern Ireland, United Kingdom
 WaterWorks (disambiguation), the former name of several water parks
 Waterworks, Isle of Man, a point on a motorcycle road-racing course used for TT and Manx Grand Prix races
 Waterworks Museum (Cape Town), South Africa
 Waterworks River, London, England, United Kingdom
 Waterworks Road, Brisbane, Queensland, Australia
 Waterworks Shopping Plaza, Pittsburgh, Pennsylvania, United States
 Decatur Waterworks, Decatur, Georgia, United States

Other uses
 Erie Water Works, a water supply company for Erie, Pennsylvania, U.S.
 an informal name for the genitourinary system (especially in Britain)

See also
 Mizu shōbai, a euphemism for the night-time entertainment business in Japan, typically translated as "water trade"